Nutbag may refer to:

Nutbag (film), a 2000 indie film
Nutbag (EP), a 2002 EP by Hot Action Cop